Temple names are posthumous titles accorded to monarchs of the Sinosphere for the purpose of ancestor worship. The practice of honoring monarchs with temple names began during the Shang dynasty in China and had since been adopted by other dynastic regimes in the Sinosphere, with the notable exception of Japan. Temple names should not be confused with era names (年號), regnal names (尊號) or posthumous names (謚號).

Modern academia usually refers to the following rulers by their temple names: Chinese monarchs from the Tang to the Yuan dynasties, Korean rulers of the Goryeo (until AD 1274) and Joseon dynasties, and Vietnamese rulers of the Lý, Trần, and Later Lê dynasties (with the Hồ and Later Trần dynasties as exceptions).

Numerous individuals who did not rule as monarch during their lifetime were posthumously elevated to the position of monarch by their descendants and honored with temple names. For example, Cao Cao was posthumously honored as an emperor and given the temple name Taizu by Cao Pi of the Cao Wei dynasty. Meanwhile, several individuals who were initially assigned temple names had their titles revoked, as was the case for Emperor Huan, whose temple name, Weizong, was abolished by Emperor Xian of the Eastern Han dynasty. In other cases, numerous individuals were honored with more than one temple name by intentional changes or being accorded different titles by different individuals. For instance, the Yongle Emperor of the Ming dynasty was originally honored as Taizong by the Hongxi Emperor, but his temple name was later amended to Chengzu by the Jiajing Emperor. There were also instances of individuals ruling as the sovereign of a particular realm but being accorded a temple name by another realm, as was the case for Möngke of the Mongol Empire, who was later honored as Xianzong by Emperor Shizu of the Yuan dynasty.
Ancient Chinese institutions

Etymology
The "temple" in "temple name" (廟號) refers to the grand temples (太廟) built by each dynasty for the purpose of ancestor worship. The temple name of each monarch was recorded on their respective ancestral tablet placed within the grand temple.
Ancient Korean institutions

History
Temple names trace their origins to the Shang dynasty of China. In earlier times, temple names were exclusively assigned to competent rulers after their passing.

The temple name system established during the Shang period utilized only four adjectives:
 太 (tài; "grand"): honored to dynastic founders;
 高 (gāo; "high"): honored to monarchs with great achievements;
 世 (shì; "eternal"): honored to rulers deemed worthy of eternal remembrance; and
 中 (zhōng; "resurgent"): honored to sovereigns who revitalized their realm following a period of decline.

Chinese monarchs of the Zhou dynasty were given posthumous names but not temple names. During the Qin dynasty, the practices both of assigning temple names and posthumous names was abandoned. The Han dynasty reintroduced both titles, although temple names were assigned sporadically and remained more exclusive than posthumous names. It was also during the Han era that other adjectives aside from the four listed above began appearing in temple names. Numerous Han emperors had their temple names removed by Liu Xie in AD 190.

Initially, in deciding whether a monarch should be honored as "祖" (zǔ; "progenitor") or "宗" (zōng; "ancestor"), a principle was strictly adhered to: "祖" was to be given to accomplished rulers while "宗" was to be assigned to virtuous rulers. However, this principle was effectively abandoned during the Sixteen Kingdoms era with the ubiquitous usage of "祖" by various non-Han regimes.

Temple names became widespread from the Tang dynasty onwards. Apart from the final ruler of a dynasty, monarchs who died prematurely, or monarchs who were deposed, most Chinese monarchs were given temple names by their descendants.

The practice of honoring rulers with temple names had since been adopted by other dynastic regimes within the Sinosphere, including those based on the Korean Peninsula and in Vietnam. Japan, while having adopted both posthumous names and era names from China, did not assign temple names to its monarchs.

Structure
Most temple names consist of two Chinese characters, unlike the more elaborate posthumous names. In extremely rare cases, temple names could consist of three Chinese characters.

The first character is an adjective, chosen to reflect the circumstances of the monarch's reign. The vocabulary may overlap with that of the posthumous names' adjectives, but for one sovereign, the temple name's adjective character usually does not repeat as one of the many adjective characters in his posthumous name.

The last character is either "祖" or "宗":
 祖 (zǔ; "progenitor"): typically used for founders, either of a dynasty or a new line within an existing one. Temple names bearing this character were also accorded to monarchs with great accomplishments. The equivalent in Korean is jo (조), and tổ in Vietnamese.
 宗 (zōng; "ancestor"): used for all other monarchs. It is rendered as jong (종) in Korean, and tông in Vietnamese.

List of temple names with the suffix zǔ
Individuals who are known by more than one temple name have their personal name in English romanization italicized.

Tàizǔ (太祖)
The temple name Tàizǔ (太祖) can be translated to mean "Grand Progenitor". It was often given to the founder of a dynasty.

Gāozǔ (高祖)
The temple name Gāozǔ (高祖) can be translated to mean "High Progenitor". It was often given to the founder of a dynasty.

Chéngzǔ (成祖)
The temple name Chéngzǔ (成祖) can be translated to mean "Accomplished Progenitor".

Chúnzǔ (純祖)
The temple name Chúnzǔ (純祖) can be translated to mean "Refined Progenitor".

Chúnzǔ (淳祖)
The temple name Chúnzǔ (淳祖) can be translated to mean "Honorable Progenitor".

Dàizǔ (代祖)
The temple name Dàizǔ (代祖) can be translated to mean "Generational Progenitor".

Dàshèngzǔ (大聖祖)
The temple name Dàshèngzǔ (大聖祖) can be translated to mean "Great Sacred Progenitor".

Dézǔ (德祖)
The temple name Dézǔ (德祖) can be translated to mean "Virtuous Progenitor".

Dùzǔ (度祖)
The temple name Dùzǔ (度祖) can be translated to mean "Magnanimous Progenitor".

Gāoshàngzǔ (高上祖)
The temple name Gāoshàngzǔ (高上祖) can be translated to mean "Venerable Progenitor".

Guāngzǔ (光祖)
The temple name Guāngzǔ (光祖) can be translated to mean "Radiant Progenitor".

Guózǔ (國祖)
The temple name Guózǔ (國祖) can be translated to mean "National Progenitor".

Hóngzǔ (弘祖)
The temple name Hóngzǔ (弘祖) can be translated to mean "Majestic Progenitor".

Húanzǔ (桓祖)
The temple name Húanzǔ (桓祖) can be translated to mean "Exploratory Forefather".

Huīzǔ (徽祖)
The temple name Huīzǔ (徽祖) can be translated to mean "Exemplary Progenitor".

Huìzǔ (惠祖)
The temple name Huìzǔ (惠祖) can be translated to mean "Compassionate Progenitor".

Jǐngzǔ (景祖)
The temple name Jǐngzǔ (景祖) can be translated to mean "Admirable Progenitor".

Jìngzǔ (敬祖)
The temple name Jìngzǔ (敬祖) can be translated to mean "Revered Progenitor".

Jìngzǔ (靖祖)
The temple name Jìngzǔ (靖祖) can be translated to mean "Conciliatory Progenitor".

Lièzǔ (烈祖)
The temple name Lièzǔ (烈祖) can be translated to mean "Ardent Progenitor".

Mùzǔ (穆祖)
The temple name Mùzǔ (穆祖) can be translated to mean "Sombre Progenitor".

Níngzǔ (寧祖)
The temple name Níngzǔ (寧祖) can be translated to mean "Amicable Progenitor".

Qìngzǔ (慶祖)
The temple name Qìngzǔ (慶祖) can be translated to mean "Celebrated Progenitor".

Rénzǔ (仁祖)
The temple name Rénzǔ (仁祖) can be translated to mean "Benevolent Progenitor".

Ruìzǔ (睿祖)
The temple name Ruìzǔ (睿祖) can be translated to mean "Astute Progenitor".

Shèngzǔ (聖祖)
The temple name Shèngzǔ (聖祖) can be translated to mean "Sagacious Progenitor".

Shénzǔ (神祖)
The temple name Shénzǔ (神祖) can be translated to mean "Spiritual Progenitor".

Shǐzǔ (始祖)
The temple name Shǐzǔ (始祖) can be translated to mean "First Progenitor".

Shìzǔ (世祖)
The temple name Shìzǔ (世祖) can be translated to mean "Eternal Progenitor".

Shùnzǔ (順祖)
The temple name Shùnzǔ (順祖) can be translated to mean "Obedient Progenitor".

Sùzǔ (肅祖)
The temple name Sùzǔ (肅祖) can be translated to mean "Solemn Progenitor".

Tàichūzǔ (太初祖)
The temple name Tàichūzǔ (太初祖) can be translated to mean "Grand Primordial Progenitor".

Tǒngzǔ (統祖)
The temple name Tǒngzǔ (統祖) can be translated to mean "Commanding Progenitor".

Wángzǔ (王祖)
The temple name Wángzǔ (王祖) can be translated to mean "Sovereign Progenitor".

Wénzǔ (文祖)
The temple name Wénzǔ (文祖) can be translated to mean "Civil Progenitor".

Xiǎnzǔ (顯祖)
The temple name Xiǎnzǔ (顯祖) can be translated to mean "Eminent Progenitor".

Xiànzǔ (憲祖)
The temple name Xiànzǔ (憲祖) can be translated to mean "Constitutional Progenitor".

Xiànzǔ (獻祖)
The temple name Xiànzǔ (獻祖) can be translated to mean "Dedicated Progenitor".

Xīngzǔ (興祖)
The temple name Xīngzǔ (興祖) can be translated to mean "Prosperous Progenitor".

Xìnzǔ (信祖)
The temple name Xìnzǔ (信祖) can be translated to mean "Faithful Progenitor".

Xīzǔ (熙祖)
The temple name Xīzǔ (熙祖) can be translated to mean "Glorious Progenitor".

Xīzǔ (僖祖)
The temple name Xīzǔ (僖祖) can be translated to mean "Jubilant Progenitor".

Xuānzǔ (宣祖)
The temple name Xuānzǔ (宣祖) can be translated to mean "Responsible Progenitor".

Xuánzǔ (玄祖)
The temple name Xuánzǔ (玄祖) can be translated to mean "Profound Progenitor".

Yánzǔ (嚴祖)
The temple name Yánzǔ (嚴祖) can be translated to mean "Austere Progenitor".

Yǎnzǔ (衍祖)
The temple name Yǎnzǔ (衍祖) can be translated to mean "Thriving Progenitor".

Yīngzǔ (英祖)
The temple name Yīngzǔ (英祖) can be translated to mean "Magnificent Progenitor".

Yìzǔ (毅祖)
The temple name Yìzǔ (毅祖) can be translated to mean "Persistent Progenitor".

Yìzǔ (懿祖)
The temple name Yìzǔ (懿祖) can be translated to mean "Benign Progenitor".

Yìzǔ (翼祖)
The temple name Yìzǔ (翼祖) can be translated to mean "Soaring Progenitor".

Yìzǔ (義祖)
The temple name Yìzǔ (義祖) can be translated to mean "Righteous Progenitor".

Yuānzǔ (淵祖)
The temple name Yuānzǔ (淵祖) can be translated to mean "Erudite Progenitor".

Yuánzǔ (元祖)
The temple name Yuánzǔ (元祖) can be translated to mean "Primal Progenitor".

Yùzǔ (裕祖)
The temple name Yùzǔ (裕祖) can be translated to mean "Affluent Progenitor".

Zhāozǔ (昭祖)
The temple name Zhāozǔ (昭祖) can be translated to mean "Illustrious Progenitor".

Zhàozǔ (肇祖)
The temple name Zhàozǔ (肇祖) can be translated to mean "Original Progenitor".

Zhèngzǔ (正祖)
The temple name Zhèngzǔ (正祖) can be translated to mean "Upstanding Progenitor".

Zhuāngzǔ (莊祖)
The temple name Zhuāngzǔ (莊祖) can be translated to mean "Dignified Progenitor".

List of temple names with the suffix zōng
Individuals who are known by more than one temple name have their personal name in English italicized.

Aīzōng (哀宗)
The temple name Aīzōng (哀宗) can be translated to mean "Lamentable Ancestor".

Ānzōng (安宗)
The temple name Ānzōng (安宗) can be translated to mean "Pacific Ancestor".

Chéngzōng (成宗)
The temple name Chéngzōng (成宗) can be translated to mean "Accomplished Ancestor".

Chóngzōng (崇宗)
The temple name Chóngzōng (崇宗) can be translated to mean "Lofty Ancestor".

Chúnzōng (純宗)
The temple name Chúnzōng (純宗) can be translated to mean "Refined Ancestor".

Dàizōng (代宗)
The temple name Dàizōng (代宗) can be translated to mean "Generational Ancestor".

Dàizōng (戴宗)
The temple name Dàizōng (戴宗) can be translated to mean "Esteemed Ancestor".

Dàozōng (道宗)
The temple name Dàozōng (道宗) can be translated to mean "Principled Ancestor".

Dézōng (德宗)
The temple name Dézōng (德宗) can be translated to mean "Virtuous Ancestor".

Dìngzōng (定宗)
The temple name Dìngzōng (定宗) can be translated to mean "Resolute Ancestor".

Duānzōng (端宗)
The temple name Duānzōng (端宗) can be translated to mean "Noble Ancestor".

Dùzōng (度宗)
The temple name Dùzōng (度宗) can be translated to mean "Magnanimous Ancestor".

Gāozōng (高宗)
The temple name Gāozōng (高宗) can be translated to mean "High Ancestor".

Gōngzōng (恭宗)
The temple name Gōngzōng (恭宗) can be translated to mean "Reverent Ancestor".

Guāngzōng (光宗)
The temple name Guāngzōng (光宗) can be translated to mean "Radiant Ancestor".

Hóngzōng (弘宗)
The temple name Hóngzōng (弘宗) can be translated to mean "Majestic Ancestor".

Huáizōng (懷宗)
The temple name Huáizōng (懷宗) can be translated to mean "Yearned Ancestor".

Huánzōng (桓宗)
The temple name Huánzōng (桓宗) can be translated to mean "Exploratory Ancestor".

Huīzōng (徽宗)
The temple name Huīzōng (徽宗) can be translated to mean "Exemplary Ancestor".

Huìzōng (惠宗)
The temple name Huìzōng (惠宗) can be translated to mean "Compassionate Ancestor".

Jiǎnzōng (簡宗)
The temple name Jiǎnzōng (簡宗) can be translated to mean "Modest Ancestor".

Jiāzōng (嘉宗)
The temple name Jiāzōng (嘉宗) can be translated to mean "Exalted Ancestor".

Jǐngzōng (景宗)
The temple name Jǐngzōng (景宗) can be translated to mean "Admirable Ancestor".

Jìngzōng (敬宗)
The temple name Jìngzōng (敬宗) can be translated to mean "Revered Ancestor".

Jìngzōng (靖宗)
The temple name Jìngzōng (靖宗) can be translated to mean "Conciliatory Ancestor".

Kāngzōng (康宗)
The temple name Kāngzōng (康宗) can be translated to mean "Harmonious Ancestor".

Lièzōng (烈宗)
The temple name Lièzōng (烈宗) can be translated to mean "Ardent Ancestor".

Lǐzōng (理宗)
The temple name Lǐzōng (理宗) can be translated to mean "Enlightened Ancestor".

Lǐzōng (禮宗)
The temple name Lǐzōng (禮宗) can be translated to mean "August Ancestor".

Míngzōng (明宗)
The temple name Míngzōng (明宗) can be translated to mean "Brilliant Ancestor".

Mǐnzōng (閔宗)
The temple name Mǐnzōng (閔宗) can be translated to mean "Solicitous Ancestor".

Mǐnzōng (愍宗)
The temple name Mǐnzōng (愍宗) can be translated to mean "Dejected Ancestor".

Mùzōng (穆宗)
The temple name Mùzōng (穆宗) can be translated to mean "Sombre Ancestor".

Níngzōng (寧宗)
The temple name Níngzōng (寧宗) can be translated to mean "Amicable Ancestor".

Píngzōng (平宗)
The temple name Píngzōng (平宗) can be translated to mean "Placid Ancestor".

Qìngzōng (慶宗)
The temple name Qìngzōng (慶宗) can be translated to mean "Celebrated Ancestor".

Qīnzōng (欽宗)
The temple name Qīnzōng (欽宗) can be translated to mean "Laudable Ancestor".

Rénzōng (仁宗)
The temple name Rénzōng (仁宗) can be translated to mean "Benevolent Ancestor".

Ruìzōng (睿宗)
The temple name Ruìzōng (睿宗) can be translated to mean "Astute Ancestor".

Shàozōng (紹宗)
The temple name Shàozōng (紹宗) can be translated to mean "Perpetual Ancestor".

Shèngzōng (聖宗)
The temple name Shèngzōng (聖宗) can be translated to mean "Sagacious Ancestor".

Shénzōng (神宗)
The temple name Shénzōng (神宗) can be translated to mean "Spiritual Ancestor".

Shìzōng (世宗)
The temple name Shìzōng (世宗) can be translated to mean "Eternal Ancestor".

Shùnzōng (順宗)
The temple name Shùnzōng (順宗) can be translated to mean "Obedient Ancestor".

Sīzōng (思宗)
The temple name Sīzōng (思宗) can be translated to mean "Pensive Ancestor".

Sùzōng (肅宗)
The temple name Sùzōng (肅宗) can be translated to mean "Solemn Ancestor".

Tàizōng (太宗)
The temple name Tàizōng (太宗) can be translated to mean "Grand Ancestor".

Tǒngzōng (統宗)
The temple name Tǒngzōng (統宗) can be translated to mean "Commanding Ancestor".

Wénzōng (文宗)
The temple name Wénzōng (文宗) can be translated to mean "Civil Ancestor".

Wēizōng (威宗)
The temple name Wēizōng (威宗) can be translated to mean "Mighty Ancestor".

Wǔzōng (武宗)
The temple name Wǔzōng (武宗) can be translated to mean "Martial Ancestor".

Xiāngzōng (襄宗)
The temple name Xiāngzōng (襄宗) can be translated to mean "Assisted Ancestor".

Xiǎnzōng (顯宗)
The temple name Xiǎnzōng (顯宗) can be translated to mean "Eminent Ancestor".

Xiànzōng (憲宗)
The temple name Xiànzōng (憲宗) can be translated to mean "Constitutional Ancestor".

Xiànzōng (獻宗)
The temple name Xiànzōng (獻宗) can be translated to mean "Dedicated Ancestor".

Xiàozōng (孝宗)
The temple name Xiàozōng (孝宗) can be translated to mean "Filial Ancestor".

Xīngzōng (興宗)
The temple name Xīngzōng (興宗) can be translated to mean "Prosperous Ancestor".

Xīzōng (熙宗)
The temple name Xīzōng (熙宗) can be translated to mean "Glorious Ancestor".

Xīzōng (僖宗)
The temple name Xīzōng (僖宗) can be translated to mean "Jubilant Ancestor".

Xīzōng (熹宗)
The temple name Xīzōng (熹宗) can be translated to mean "Coruscating Ancestor".

Xuānzōng (宣宗)
The temple name Xuānzōng (宣宗) can be translated to mean "Responsible Ancestor".

Xuánzōng (玄宗)
The temple name Xuánzōng (玄宗) can be translated to mean "Profound Ancestor".

Yīngzōng (英宗)
The temple name Yīngzōng (英宗) can be translated to mean "Magnificent Ancestor".

Yìzōng (毅宗)
The temple name Yìzōng (毅宗) can be translated to mean "Persistent Ancestor".

Yìzōng (懿宗)
The temple name Yìzōng (懿宗) can be translated to mean "Benign Ancestor".

Yìzōng (翼宗)
The temple name Yìzōng (翼宗) can be translated to mean "Soaring Ancestor".

Yìzōng (義宗)
The temple name Yìzōng (義宗) can be translated to mean "Righteous Ancestor".

Yìzōng (藝宗)
The temple name Yìzōng (藝宗) can be translated to mean "Competent Ancestor".

Yìzōng (益宗)
The temple name Yìzōng (益宗) can be translated to mean "Flourishing Ancestor".

Yòuzōng (佑宗)
The temple name Yòuzōng (佑宗) can be translated to mean "Blessed Ancestor".

Yuánzōng (元宗)
The temple name Yuánzōng (元宗) can be translated to mean "Primal Ancestor".

Yùzōng (裕宗)
The temple name Yùzōng (裕宗) can be translated to mean "Affluent Ancestor".

Zhāngzōng (章宗)
The temple name Zhāngzōng (章宗) can be translated to mean "Decorous Ancestor".

Zhāozōng (昭宗)
The temple name Zhāozōng (昭宗) can be translated to mean "Illustrious Ancestor".

Zhèngzōng (正宗)
The temple name Zhèngzōng (正宗) can be translated to mean "Upstanding Ancestor".

Zhēnzōng (真宗)
The temple name Zhēnzōng (真宗) can be translated to mean "Sterling Ancestor".

Zhēnzōng (貞宗)
The temple name Zhēnzōng (貞宗) can be translated to mean "Steadfast Ancestor".

Zhézōng (哲宗)
The temple name Zhézōng (哲宗) can be translated to mean "Sapient Ancestor".

Zhìzōng (質宗)
The temple name Zhìzōng (質宗) can be translated to mean "Spartan Ancestor".

Zhōngzōng (中宗)
The temple name Zhōngzōng (中宗) can be translated to mean "Resurgent Ancestor".

Zhuāngzōng (莊宗)
The temple name Zhuāngzōng (莊宗) can be translated to mean "Dignified Ancestor".

List of proposed but rejected temple names
This list contains temple names that were proposed but were ultimately rejected in favor of another temple name. These temple names were not accorded to other monarchs.

 Chunzong (淳宗): proposed for Zhao Yun
 Dazong (大宗): proposed for Zhao Gou
 Qianzong (乾宗): proposed for Zhu Youjian
 Shizong (實宗): proposed for Zhao Qi
 Yaozong (堯宗): proposed for Zhao Gou

List of temple names with limited recognition
This list contains individuals whose temple names were derived from unverified or uncertain sources and are not widely recognized by the academia. Nonetheless, referencing these individuals by their unofficial temple names is sometimes seen in non-academic sources.

See also
 List of Chinese monarchs
 List of monarchs of Korea
 List of monarchs of Vietnam
 Regnal name
 Chinese era name
 List of Chinese era names
 Japanese era name
 Korean era name
 Vietnamese era name
 Posthumous name

References 

Chinese monarchs
Chinese culture
Korean rulers
Korean culture
Vietnamese monarchs
Vietnamese culture
Posthumous recognitions
Titles